Encolpotis heliopepta is a moth in the family Gelechiidae. It was described by Edward Meyrick in 1918. It is found in Assam, India.

The wingspan is about 14 mm. The forewings are purple fuscous, rather darker towards the costa and termen. The stigmata are cloudy, obscurely darker, with the plical beneath the first discal, the second discal transversely double. The hindwings are dark grey.

References

Gelechiinae
Moths described in 1918
Taxa named by Edward Meyrick